Dorres is a commune in the Pyrénées-Orientales department in southern France.

Geography

Localisation 
Dorres is located in the canton of Les Pyrénées catalanes and in the arrondissement of Prades.

History 
Various tools and evidence of occupation found in the surroundings prove that the territory of Dorres was already occupied in prehistoric times.

At the end of the 9th century, Dorres was a property of Sunifred (who died ca. 890), a son of Sunifred, count of Cerdanya. Having become the abbot of the Abbey of Arles-sur-Tech, Sunifred then gave Dorres to his nephew and godson Radulf, himself the son of Wilfred the Hairy and future bishop of Urgell. Later, in the 12th century, is found the name of Guillem de Edorres, supposed to be the local lord. From the 14th century, Dorres becomes part of the crown estate.

Being mainly mountain territory, Dorres was never much populated and reached its peak of population in 1851, with about 366 people, and it was yet until the end of the 19th century that locals were attacked by wolves.

Population

Sites of interest 
 Notre-Dame-de-Belloc chapel.
 Saint John church.
 Magette chapel.
 Hot springs of sulfur water.

See also
Communes of the Pyrénées-Orientales department

References

Communes of Pyrénées-Orientales